Port Matilda is a borough in Centre County, Pennsylvania. It is part of the State College, Pennsylvania metropolitan statistical area and is located approximately halfway between State College and Altoona. The population was 606 at the 2010 census.

Geography
Port Matilda is located at  (40.800056, -78.051119).

Demographics

At the 2010 census, there were 606 people, 262 households, and 165 families residing in the borough. The population density was 1,110.7 people per square mile (428.9/km²). There were 289 housing units at an average density of 529.7 per square mile (204.5/km²). The racial makeup of the borough was 98.0% White, 0.1% Black or African American, 0.1% Native American, 0.1% Asian, 0.8% from other races, and 0.8% from two or more races. Hispanic or Latino of any race were 1.2%.

There were 262 households, 26.3% had children under the age of 18 living with them, 47.3% were married couples living together, 4.6% had male householder with no wife present, 11.1% had a female householder with no husband present, and 37.0% were non-families. 30.2% of households were made up of individuals, and 10.7% were one person aged 65 or older. The average household size was 2.31 and the average family size was 2.88.

In the borough, the population was spread out, with 19.5% under the age of 18, 10.1% from 18 to 24, 29.2% from 25 to 44, 28.8% from 45 to 64, and 12.4% 65 or older. The median age was 40 years. For every 100 females there were 103.4 males. For every 100 females age 18 and over, there were 101.7 males.

The median income for a household in the borough was $32,054, and the median family income  was $53,750.  The per capita income for the borough was $19,418. About 14.5% of families and 20.2% of the population were below the poverty line, including 54.9% of those under age 18 and 3.2% of those age 65 or over.

History
Squire Clement Beckwith laid out the town in 1850 and named it to honor his daughter, Matilda. Why he chose to call it Port Matilda is not clear, but the name may have reflected his hope that the town would eventually be connected to the Bald Eagle and Spring Creek Branch of the Pennsylvania Canal. While the canal did not reach Port Matilda, the Bald Eagle Railroad did, and the community became a market center in the Bald Eagle Valley for agricultural and lumber products.

Industrial history
Port Matilda was home to McFeely Brick Co., located on Brick St. at the east end of the town adjacent to the railroad. The company was based in Latrobe, Pennsylvania and founded by Fred McFeely, the grandfather of children's television personality Fred Rogers. The company was later owned by General Refractories, which closed the Port Matilda plant in 1959. Its primary product was silica fire brick made from ganister rock, using beehive kilns. Its bricks were typically stamped "Vulcan".

References

External links
 Port Matilda Volunteer Fire Department
 Parks in Port Matilda

1836 establishments in Pennsylvania
Boroughs in Centre County, Pennsylvania
Populated places established in 1836